Pope Adrian III or Hadrian III ( or Hadrianus; died July 885) was the bishop of Rome and ruler of the Papal States from 17 May 884 to his death. He served for little more than a year, during which he worked to help the people of Italy in a very troubled time of famine and war.

Background
Adrian III was born in Rome. According to Jean Mabillon, his birth name was Agapitus. Reginald L. Poole believes that Mabillon confused Adrian III, who succeeded Marinus I, with Agapetus II, who succeeded Marinus II a century later.

Pontificate
Adrian laboured hard to alleviate the misery of the people of Italy, prey to famine and to continuous war. He is also known to have written a letter condemning the Christians of both Muslim-ruled and Christian-ruled parts of Spain for being too friendly with the Jews in these lands.

Adrian died in July 885 at San Cesario sul Panaro (Modena), not long after embarking on a trip to Worms, in modern Germany. The purpose of the journey was to attend an Imperial Diet after being summoned by Emperor Charles the Fat to settle the imperial succession and discuss the rising power of the Saracens.

Adrian's death and subsequent burial in the church of San Silvestro Nonantola Abbey near Modena is commemorated in the sculpted reliefs that frame the doorway of this church. His relics are found near the high altar, and his tomb at once became a popular place of pilgrimage. His cult was confirmed by Pope Leo XIII on 2 June 1891, and his feast day is celebrated on 8 July.

See also

List of Catholic saints
List of popes

References

Further reading

External links
 Opera Omnia Hadriani III by Migne, Patrologia Latina, with analytical indexes

Adrian 03
Adrian 03
Adrian 03
Adrian 03
Adrian 03
9th-century Christian saints
Burials at Nonantola Abbey
Adrian 03
Year of birth unknown
9th-century popes
Canonizations by Pope Leo XIII